Isodontia  is a genus belonging to the family Sphecidae. Adults emerge from their cocoons in early summer, and usually make nests lined with grass or hay in hollow plant cavities. This has led to their common name being grass-carrying wasps. The larvae are often fed Orthoptera that the adult has paralyzed.

Species
Species within this genus include:

 Isodontia albata
 Isodontia alvarengai
 Isodontia apicalis
 Isodontia apicata
 Isodontia aurifrons
 Isodontia auripes
 Isodontia auripygata
 Isodontia azteca
 Isodontia bastiniana
 Isodontia boninensis
 Isodontia bruneri
 Isodontia capillata
 Isodontia cellicula
 Isodontia cestra
 Isodontia chrysorrhoea
 Isodontia costipennis
 Isodontia cyanipennis
 Isodontia delicata
 Isodontia diodon
 Isodontia dolosa
 Isodontia edax
 Isodontia egens
 Isodontia elegans
 Isodontia elsei
 Isodontia exornata
 Isodontia formosicola
 Isodontia franzi
 Isodontia fuscipennis
 Isodontia guaranitica
 Isodontia harmandi
 Isodontia immaculata
 Isodontia jaculator
 Isodontia laevipes
 Isodontia leonina
 Isodontia longiventris
 Isodontia maidli
 Isodontia mexicana
 Isodontia nidulans
 Isodontia nigella
 Isodontia nigelloides
 Isodontia obscurella
 Isodontia ochroptera
 Isodontia paludosa
 Isodontia papua
 Isodontia paranensis
 Isodontia pelopoeiformis
 Isodontia pempuchi
 Isodontia permutans
 Isodontia petiolata
 Isodontia philadelphica
 Isodontia pilipes
 Isodontia poeyi
 Isodontia praslinia
 Isodontia sepicola
 Isodontia severini
 Isodontia simoni
 Isodontia sonani
 Isodontia splendidula
 Isodontia stanleyi
 Isodontia vanlinhi
 Isodontia vidua
 Isodontia visseri

References

Sphecidae